How I Learned to Love Women (also known as Love Parade) is a 1966 Italian-French-German comedy film directed by Luciano Salce.

Cast
 Michèle Mercier as Franziska
 Nadja Tiller as Baroness Laura
 Elsa Martinelli as Rallye driver
 Anita Ekberg as Margaret Joyce
 Robert Hoffmann as Robert
 Zarah Leander as Olga
 Sandra Milo as Ilde
 Romina Power as Irene
 Orchidea De Santis as Agnes
 Vittorio Caprioli as Playboy
 Sonja Romanoff as Monika
 Erica Schramm as Betty
 Gigi Ballista as Sir Archibald
 Heinz Erhardt as Schluessel
 Chantal Cachin as Wilma
 Gianrico Tedeschi as Director 
 Mita Medici 
 Carlo Croccolo 
 Mariangela Giordano

References

External links

1966 films
1966 comedy films
Italian comedy films
French comedy films
German comedy films
West German films
Films directed by Luciano Salce
Films scored by Ennio Morricone
1960s Italian films
1960s French films
1960s German films